Francis McAvoy (born 16 November 1875 in Ayr, deceased) was a Scottish professional footballer who made 44 appearances in the Football League for Woolwich Arsenal. He also played for Scottish Football League club Ayr at the start and end of his career, and for Southern League clubs Brighton United, Gravesend United, Brighton & Hove Albion and Watford. He played as a left half or outside left. McAvoy played 69 games in all competitions, scoring once, for Brighton United, and was Brighton & Hove Albion's captain and top scorer in the club's first season, 1901–02, with nine goals in all competitions. At Watford he played 24 competitive matches, scoring twice.

Controversy

In December 1901 McAvoy had a confrontation with Brighton & Hove Albion's manager, John Jackson which didn't calm down. This culminated in McAvoy assaulting Jackson and knocking him to the ground the following February. McAvoy was sacked from the club as a result. In August, McAvoy, along with fellow former player, Clem Barker, went to the Farm Tavern (which Jackson ran) looking for him. He was away and the pair told his wife; "We are going to the station to meet your husband, and you must consider yourself lucky if he is brought home alive!". They were found guilty of threatening behaviour and bound to keep the peace for 6 months.

References

1875 births
Place of death missing
Year of death missing
20th-century deaths
Footballers from Ayr
Scottish footballers
Association football outside forwards
Association football wing halves
Arsenal F.C. players
Brighton & Hove Albion F.C. players
Watford F.C. players
Ayr F.C. players
Scottish Football League players
English Football League players
Southern Football League players
Brighton United F.C. players